Law of the Texan is a 1938 American Western film directed by Elmer Clifton and written by Monroe Shaff and Arthur Hoerl. The film stars Buck Jones, Dorothy Fay, Kenneth Harlan, Don Douglas, Matty Kemp and Joe Whitehead. The film was released on October 24, 1938, by Columbia Pictures.

Plot
Shipments are being stolen, so the Rangers send Buck and his men to protect the next shipment, when that is also stolen, Buck is kicked out of the Rangers and joins the gang responsible for the crimes. But that is just an excuse to find the leader of the gang known as El Coyote.

Cast          
Buck Jones as Sergeant Buck Weaver 
Dorothy Fay as Helen Clifford
Kenneth Harlan as Allen Spencer
Don Douglas as Chet Hackett 
Matty Kemp as Jack Bryant
Joe Whitehead as Flaherty
Forrest Taylor as Captain Moore 
José Luis Tortosa as Col. Sanchez 
Tommy Mack as Juan
Milisa Sierra as Rosa
Bob Kortman as Quinn

References

External links
 

1938 films
1930s English-language films
American Western (genre) films
1938 Western (genre) films
Columbia Pictures films
Films directed by Elmer Clifton
1930s American films